Alexander Widiker (born 27 April 1982) is a German international rugby union player, playing for Heidelberger RK in the Rugby-Bundesliga and, formerly, the German national rugby union team.

Widiker played in the 2011 and 2012 German championship final for Heidelberger RK, which the club both won, with Widiker scoring a try in the 2011 game.

Widiker is one of the few German players who has successfully played abroad. From 2006 to 2010, he played for the RC Orléans in the Fédérale 1, alongside two other German internationals, the brothers Matthieu and Guillaume Franke. In his last season with RCO he was also the team's captain.

Biography
Widiker was born 27 April 1982 in Kustanay, Soviet Union (present day Kostanay, Kazakhstan), as one of three children, as an ethnic German. His parents, Friedrich and Emilia Widiker, are of Volga German descent. Widiker's grandparents were forcefully removed from the former Volga German Republic to the Kazakh SSR. When Widiker was eleven years old, his family moved to Germany. Initially, the family moved to Bramsche in Lower Saxony but was then allocated accommodation in Leipzig. Eventually, the family chose to move to Wiesloch, near Heidelberg.

Widiker, who played association football, ice hockey and basketball in Kazakhstan, only began playing rugby when going to school in Germany. He joined the TB Rohrbach, which later merged its youth team with the SC Neuenheim, where he made his debut in the senior team at the age of 17. He played for the German Under-17 and Under-19 team, taking part in two world championships, before making his debut for the senior side on 21 October 2001 against Sweden.

Before moving to France, Widiker, who has been playing rugby since 1994, won two German championships with his former club, SC Neuenheim, in 2003 and 2004.

Widiker was scheduled to return to Germany for the 2010–11 season to play for SC Neuenheim once more, but instead joint Heidelberger RK. He is also the new German captain, leading the team for the first time on 20 November 2010 against Poland.

With the final game against Moldova, Alexander Widiker played his 50th game for his country, thereby equaling Horst Kemmling's record of number of internationals for the DRV. He overtook Kemmling's record when he played his 51st game against the Ukraine on 27 October 2012.

Widiker retired from international rugby after a record 58 games for Germany after a 76–12 win against the Czech Republic in April 2014, citing increased personal and business commitments as his reason. He however returned to the German team one more time in May in the decisive world cup qualifier against Russia which Germany lost.

Honours

Club
 German rugby union championship
 Champions: 2003, 2004, 2011, 2012, 2013
 German rugby union cup
 Winners: 2001, 2011

National team
 European Nations Cup – Division 2
 Champions: 2008

Stats
Alexander Widiker's personal statistics in club and international rugby:

Club

 As of 4 December 2013

National team

European Nations Cup

Friendlies & other competitions

 As of 24 April 2014

References

External links
 Alexander Widiker at scrum.com
   Alexander Widiker at totalrugby.de
  Alexander Widiker at the DRV website

1982 births
Living people
German rugby union players
Germany international rugby union players
Expatriate rugby union players in France
RC Orléans players
SC Neuenheim players
Heidelberger RK players
Rugby union props
People from Kostanay
People of Volga German descent
Kazakhstani people of German descent
German expatriate rugby union players
German expatriate sportspeople in France
Kazakhstani emigrants to Germany